National Foods Limited is a Pakistani multinational food products company founded in 1970, which started out as a spice company, and is based in Karachi, Pakistan. It is a major food products company in Pakistan.

History
In 1988, National Foods became the certified vendor of McCormick, United States. In the same year, National Foods, then a Private Limited company was converted into a Public Limited company, traded on all the three stock exchanges of Pakistan. On 11 January 2016, all three former city stock exchanges in Pakistan merged to form Pakistan Stock Exchange.

With a range of over 250 food products in over 10 major categories, National Foods is one of the prominent food companies in Pakistan.

The company was incorporated in Pakistan on 19 February  1970 as a private limited company under the Companies Act, 1913 and subsequently converted into a public limited company under the Companies Ordinance, 1984 by a special resolution passed in the extraordinary general meeting held on March 30, 1988. The company is principally engaged in the manufacture and sale of convenience-based food products. The registered office of the company is situated at 12 / CL - 6, Claremont Road, Civil Lines, Karachi.

In 2013, as a company National Foods Limited (Pakistan) was listed on the Forbes List of  Asia's 200 Best Under A Billion (2013).

In 2017, National Foods Limited acquired a controlling interest in Canadian company A1 Cash & Carry to further expand its operations across the globe. A1 Cash & Carry is a wholesale distributor of foodservice products, disposables, and sanitation/janitorial products in Canada. This company is partially owned by a Canadian-based Pakistani businessman Amjad Pervaiz.

Subsidiaries
 National Foods DMCC (Dubai)
 National Foods Pakistan (UK) Limited
 National Epicure Inc, (Canada)

Products
 Spices, pickles, tomato ketchup, jams, jellies, sauces, cooking pastes, fruit juices, fruit drinks 
Biryanis, curries, barbeque items and kababs (ready-to-eat-meals)

Factories
The company operates factories in the following cities:
 Gujranwala
 Nooriabad
 Karachi
 Faisalabad

See also 
 Shan Foods

References

External links
 National Foods Limited official website

Flavor companies
Food manufacturers of Pakistan
Manufacturing companies based in Karachi
Food and drink companies based in Karachi
Food and drink companies established in 1970
Companies listed on the Pakistan Stock Exchange
Pakistani brands
Pakistani companies established in 1970